United States v. Schwimmer, 279 U.S. 644 (1929), was a case decided by the Supreme Court of the United States.
It concerned a pacifist applicant for naturalization who in the interview declared not to be willing to "take up arms personally" in defense of the United States. Originally found unable by the District Court for the Northern District of Illinois to take the prescribed oath of allegiance, a decision reversed in appeal, the case was argued before the Supreme Court, which ruled against the applicant, and thus denied her the possibility of becoming a United States citizen.

Details
Rosika Schwimmer was a pacifist who would not take the oath of allegiance to become a naturalized citizen. She was born in Hungary and in the United States, she delivered a lecture and decided that she wanted to become a US citizen. When asked if she would be willing to "take up arms in defense of her country," she responded in the negative. She stated that she believed in the democratic ideal, but she asserted that she was an uncompromising pacifist: "My cosmic consciousness of belonging to the human family is shared by all those who believe that all human beings are the children of God."

Court decision
The Court held in a 6–3 decision that citizenship should be denied.

Quotes from the majority opinion by Justice Butler

Quotes from the dissenting opinion by Justice Holmes (Justice Brandeis concurring)

Significance

The Court placed great emphasis on the interest of the state to foster feelings of nationalism even though the nationalist beliefs of the country may have some conflict with religious beliefs. The case is best known, however, for Justice Holmes's phrase concerning "freedom for the thought that we hate," which has become a favorite statement of the underlying principles of free speech embodied in the First Amendment.

See also
List of United States Supreme Court cases, volume 279
Girouard v. United States, which overturned this decision
Freedom for the Thought That We Hate: A Biography of the First Amendment, by Anthony Lewis

Further reading

External links
 
 

United States Supreme Court cases
United States Supreme Court cases of the Taft Court
United States immigration and naturalization case law
1929 in United States case law
Pacifism in the United States
Hungary–United States relations